Hirokatsu (written: 博且, 博克 or 寛豪) is a masculine Japanese given name. Notable people with the name include:

, Japanese badminton player
, Japanese water polo player
, Japanese triathlete

Japanese masculine given names